Sainte-Élizabeth-de-Warwick is a municipality located in the Centre-du-Québec region of Quebec, Canada.

Before February 2, 2008, the name was spelled Sainte-Élisabeth-de-Warwick.

The municipality is located in the Township of Warwick mainly in the western part of range IV.

References

Municipalities in Quebec
Incorporated places in Centre-du-Québec